Dream Riders is a 2008 American documentary film that shows a father's attempt to mend a broken relationship with his son.  Bill Roulston takes his son, Nico, on a 4,000 mile bike journey across the United States to close the gap in their growing emotional divide.  Bill and Nico depart on their planned 65-day journey from Hobuck Beach, Washington and end in Coney Island, New York 97 days later.  The documentary is played on the Travel Channel.

Awards 
 2009 International Family Film Festival
 2009 New Strand Film Festival

References

External links

American sports documentary films
2008 films
2008 documentary films
Documentary films about families
Documentary films about cycling
2000s English-language films
2000s American films